Teenage Mutant Ninja Turtles is a 2003 Game Boy Advance video game, based on the 2003 TV series. In this game each turtle has his own unique set of levels to complete. In addition to the traditional side-scrolling levels, there are third-person view races, a shell-glider level for Donatello and a bike race between Raphael and Casey Jones. The game was also issued in a double pack with its sequel TMNT 2: Battle Nexus.

Gameplay
Teenage Mutant Ninja Turtles is a regular beat 'em up platform game. After the player chooses one of the Ninja Turtles, each of whom has a special ability, the character enters a set of four acts, one of which is a vehicle-riding minigame. Leonardo can crawl through small spaces and rides the hovercraft Sewer Slider for a rail shooter minigame. Michelangelo can wall jump, and rides a skateboard through the sewers. Donatello climbs pipes and has a shoot 'em up level using a hang glider. Raphael uses his sai to climb walls and has a motorcycle racing minigame riding the Shell Cycle against Casey Jones.

Plot
Shortly after a group of mouser robots destroy the Turtles' old home, they begin to attack their new home. Eventually the Turtles trace the robots back to Baxter Stockman's factory, where they save young April O'Neil. Afterwards Michelangelo gets on Raphael's nerves, making Raphael leave to the surface. At the surface, he is confronted by Purple Dragon thugs, and meets Casey Jones, who equally hates that gang. Afterwards Stockman develops for the Foot Clan invisible foot tech ninjas to capture Raphael, forcing the Turtles to rescue them and Donatello to use a cloaking device detector to properly fight the invisible ninjas. Afterward, they are confronted by genetically mutated beings.

Once all four levels are completed, the Turtles strike on the Foot headquarters, where they fight Hun before going after the Foot leader, The Shredder.

Critical reception

The GBA version received mixed to positive reviews by critics. The graphics and minigames were complimented, but the gameplay was found repetitive and complaints were raised against the lack of multiplayer.

References

External links

2003 video games
Game Boy Advance games
Game Boy Advance-only games
Konami beat 'em ups
Video games based on Teenage Mutant Ninja Turtles
Video games developed in Japan
Video games set in New York City